The 2011 Volta a Catalunya was the 91st running of the Volta a Catalunya cycling stage race. It started on 21 March in Lloret de Mar and ended on 27 March in Barcelona, and consisted on seven stages. It was the fifth race of the 2011 UCI World Tour season.

The race was won by  rider Alberto Contador, who claimed the leader's white with green-striped jersey with a stage win on stage three, maintaining his advantage until the end of the race. Contador's winning margin over runner-up Michele Scarponi was 23 seconds, and 's Dan Martin completed the podium, 35 seconds down on Contador. Martin made the podium at the expense of  rider Levi Leipheimer, who pulled out of the race before the final stage.

In the race's other classifications, 's Rubén Pérez took home the white jersey for amassing the highest number of points during stages at intermediate sprints,  rider Nairo Quintana won the King of the Mountains classification, with  finishing at the head of the teams classification.

Teams

24 teams were invited to the 2011 Volta a Catalunya. The teams were:

Route

Stages

Stage 1
21 March 2011 – Lloret de Mar to Lloret de Mar,

Stage 2
22 March 2011 – Santa Coloma de Farners to Banyoles,

Stage 3
23 March 2011 – La Vall d'en Bas to Vallnord,

Stage 4
24 March 2011 – La Seu d'Urgell to El Vendrell,

Stage 5
25 March 2011 – El Vendrell to Tarragona,

Stage 6
26 March 2011 – Tarragona to Mollet del Vallès,

Stage 7 
27 March 2011 – Parets del Vallès to Barcelona,

Classification leadership
In the 2011 Volta a Catalunya, three different jerseys were awarded. For the general classification, calculated by adding the finishing times of the stages per cyclist, the leader received a white jersey with green stripes on the sleeves, midsection, and collar. This classification was considered the most important of the Volta a Catalunya, and the winner of the general classification was considered the winner of the Volta a Catalunya.

Additionally, there was also a sprint classification, indicated with a white jersey. In the sprint classification, cyclists received points for being one of the first three in intermediate sprints, with three points awarded for first place, two for second, and one for third.

There was also a mountains classification, indicated with a red jersey. In the mountains classifications, points were won by reaching the top of a mountain before other cyclists. All climbs were categorized, hors-, first, second, or third-category, with more points available for the higher-categorized climbs.

References

External links
 

2011
Volta
2011 in Spanish road cycling
2011 UCI World Tour
March 2011 sports events in Europe